The 2007 Canadian Floorball Championships were the first national championships in Canadian floorball. It was held in June 2007 in Montreal, Quebec. The province of Quebec captured the men's national championship, while the province of Ontario captured the national championship on the women's side. The 2007 Canadian Floorball Championships were also the first tournament sanctioned by Floorball Canada.

Men's championship results

Preliminary round 

Note: All times are EST

Qualification round
The two teams at the bottom of the table after the preliminary round play each other in a qualification match to decide who plays in the championship match against the team at the top of the table. The losing team wins the bronze medal and captures 3rd place. The winning team is guaranteed at least 2nd place and a silver medal.

Note: All times are EST

Championship match 
The team at the top of the table at the end of the preliminary round receives an automatic bye into the championship match. They will play against the winner of the qualification round for the Canadian National Floorball Championship.

Note: All times are EST

Women's championship results
Since there are only two women's teams in the 2007 Canadian Floorball Championships, the teams play 2 games against each other, and the winner of the tournament is found using aggregate scoring.

Note: All times are EST

Results

Men's Standings

Women's Standings

External links 
 Official Championships Page

Floorball competitions
Floorball in Canada
Canadian Floorball Championships, 2007